Pterospermum yunnanense is a species of flowering plant in the family Malvaceae. It is found only in Yiwa, Mengla County and Youluo Mountain, Jinghong in Yunnan, China.

References

yunnanense
Critically endangered plants
Taxonomy articles created by Polbot